Samsung Ativ (stylized as ATIV) is the brand name used for a series of Microsoft Windows-based personal computers and mobile computing devices produced by Samsung Electronics. The word Ativ is the word vita, meaning "life", written backwards. 

The brand was originally used for Samsung's Windows 8 and Windows Phone 8-based tablets and smartphones, including one device running Windows RT. In April 2013, Samsung announced that it would extend the brand to all of its future PC products (including conventional laptops and desktop computers, such as its newly introduced Ativ Book 5 and Ativ Book 6), and re-branded some of its existing product lines and models under the Ativ name, including "Ativ Book" (for laptops), and "Ativ One" (for all-in-one computers).

Although all of Samsung's Windows products had been branded under the Ativ name, this changed in January 2016 when Samsung released the Galaxy TabPro S, its first Windows 10 device under the Galaxy brand, which had traditionally been reserved only for Samsung devices running the rival Android operating system.

Smartphones
Samsung Ativ S
Samsung Ativ Odyssey
Samsung Ativ SE
Samsung ATIV S Neo

Tablets and convertibles 

 Samsung Ativ Tab (Windows RT)
 Samsung Ativ Tab 5 (Smart PC) (Windows 8)
 Samsung Ativ Tab 7 (Smart PC Pro) (Windows 8)
 Samsung Ativ Tab 3 (Windows 8)
 Samsung Ativ Q (Windows 8 and Android 4.2.2 Jellybean)

Personal computers

Laptops 

Samsung Ativ Book 2 
Samsung Ativ Book 4 370 
Samsung Ativ Book 4 510 
Samsung Ativ Book 5 
Samsung Ativ Book 6 
Samsung Ativ Book 7 
Samsung Ativ Book 8 
Samsung Ativ Book 9 Plus (Black) (Windows 8)
Samsung Ativ Book 9 Lite (White) (Windows 8/ Pro)

Desktops

Samsung Ativ One 3
Samsung Ativ One 5
Samsung Ativ One 7
Samsung Ativ One 7 Curved

See also
 Omnia, brand used for a family of Windows Mobile and Windows Phone 7 devices.
 Galaxy, brand used for Samsung's family of Android-based products.
 Lumia, smartphone and tablet series by Microsoft with powered by Windows Phone and Windows RT.

References

G
Computer-related introductions in 2012